"Das Model" ("The Model" in English) is a song recorded by the German group Kraftwerk in 1978, written by musicians Ralf Hütter and Karl Bartos, with artist Emil Schult collaborating on the lyrics. It is featured on the album, Die Mensch-Maschine (known in international versions as The Man-Machine).

In 1981 the song was re-released to coincide with the release of the studio album Computerwelt (Computer World in English). It reached no. 1 in UK Singles Chart. Both the German and English versions of the song have been covered by other artists, including Snakefinger, Hikashu, Big Black and Robert.

Background
The lyrics were written by Emil Schult, who was in love with a model when he wrote the song. He also composed music for the song, though it was too guitar-heavy for the musical concept of Kraftwerk and it was rewritten by Bartos and Hütter to fit the sound of the band.

As with all of the songs on The Man-Machine, The Model was released in both German- and English-language versions. The lyrics are very close between two versions, with the exception of a guttaral-sounding "Korrekt!" added after the line "Sie trinkt in Nachtclubs immer Sekt" in the German version. (The English lyric is "She's going out to nightclubs, drinking just champagne.") This was an in-joke by the band. In his autobiography, I Was A Robot, former Kraftwerk member Wolfgang Flür  explains:

Charts

Certifications and sales

Rammstein cover

German Neue Deutsche Härte and industrial metal band Rammstein covered the German version of "Das Model" in 1997 as "Das Modell". It was released as a non-album single. "Das Modell" is introduced by a French phrase spoken by film editor Mathilde Bonnefoy. The single contains three non-album tracks taken from the Sehnsucht recording sessions. In the special version of "Alter Mann", Bobo (Christiane Hebold) sings alongside Till Lindemann in the chorus.

Track listings
Promo CD

Enhanced CD

Charts

Weekly charts

Year-end charts

See also
List of UK Singles Chart number ones of the 1980s

References

External links

"Das Modell" covers 

1978 songs
1978 singles
1981 singles
1997 singles
EMI Records singles
Kraftwerk songs
Rammstein songs
Songs written by Emil Schult
Songs written by Karl Bartos
Songs written by Ralf Hütter
UK Singles Chart number-one singles